Daniel Richard Espinosa (born April 25, 1987) is an American former professional baseball infielder. He has played in Major League Baseball (MLB) for the Washington Nationals, Los Angeles Angels, Seattle Mariners, and Tampa Bay Rays.

Amateur career
Espinosa attended Mater Dei High School in Santa Ana, California. He then enrolled at California State University, Long Beach, to play college baseball for the Long Beach State Dirtbags. He played shortstop and batted .303 with 11 home runs and 98 runs batted in in his three-year career. As a freshman, he was the Big West Conference Freshman of the Year. After the 2006 season, he played collegiate summer baseball with the Chatham A's of the Cape Cod Baseball League.

Professional career

Minor leagues
The Washington Nationals selected Espinosa in the third round of the 2008 MLB draft. Espinosa spent the rest of the 2008 summer with the Vermont Lake Monsters of the Class A-Short Season New York-Penn League, where he batted .328. The following year he was promoted to the Potomac Nationals of the Class A-Advanced Carolina League, and hit .264 with a .375 on-base percentage while hitting 18 home runs with 72 runs batted in and 29 steals, and was a High-A and Carolina League All Star. He began 2010 with the Harrisburg Senators of the Class AA Eastern League, hitting .262 with 18 home runs, before being promoted to the Syracuse Chiefs of the Class AAA International League. With Syracuse, he hit .295 with four home runs and was just the second player in all of organized baseball to reach 20 home runs and 20 stolen bases in 2010. At Syracuse, Espinosa, who had played shortstop for his college and minor league career, was shifted to second base, since Ian Desmond was already playing shortstop for the Nationals.

Washington Nationals

When the MLB rosters expanded on September 1, 2010, Espinosa was called up to the MLB for the first time. He appeared in his first MLB game that night. In his first MLB at bat, he hit a ground ball to second base that took an odd hop and went into right field, allowing Espinosa to turn it into a double when he saw that the right fielder had not charged the ball.
On September 6, 2010 against the New York Mets, in his first MLB game at Nationals Park, Espinosa went 4 for 5, with two home runs (the second and third of his career) including a grand slam and six runs batted in. Espinosa played in the Puerto Rican winter league after the 2010 season.

Espinosa had a productive 2011 season, hitting 21 home runs and stealing 17 bases. He finished 6th in the National League Rookie of the Year balloting. He was also hit by a pitch 19 times, tied for first with Justin Upton.

Espinosa began the 2012 season in an extended slump, hitting .205 in April with 2 runs batted in. He rebounded after the All-Star break, hitting .300 in July. Espinosa finished the 2012 season leading the National league in strikeouts with 189. He hit 17 home runs while also stealing 20 bases.

Espinosa began the 2013 season with another slump, hitting .171 through mid-May. He was consequently sent down to the AAA club at Syracuse and batted .216 with 2 home runs, 22 runs batted in, and 6 stolen bases over 75 games for the rest of his season in the minors. In April 2014 he added another 3 home-run to his baseball career along with .291 in batting and .831 on-base plus slugging. He batted .158/.193/.272 in 158 at bats.

The following two seasons, Espinosa was a utility player for the Nationals, playing all the infield positions and left field. In 2016, he was named the starting shortstop for the Nationals and played the whole season only at shortstop. He set career highs in home runs with 24 and runs batted in with 72, and was third in the majors in hit by pitches with 20. He was named National League Player of the Week in early July for a five-homer, 17-RBI performance. He finished the season with a career-high 24 home runs and 72 RBI, but his .209 batting average was the lowest of all qualified major league batters.

Los Angeles Angels
After the 2016 season, the Nationals acquired outfielder Adam Eaton, with the intent of moving Trea Turner to shortstop.
The Nationals then traded Espinosa to the Los Angeles Angels for pitchers Austin Adams and Kyle McGowin on December 10, 2016.

Espinosa's first hit as an Angel was a big three-run home run in the ninth inning that put Los Angeles ahead, 7–6, in his second game with the team. The Angels closed out the win in the bottom of the ninth, making Espinosa's home run the game-winning hit. In his lone season with the team, Espinosa struggled offensively through the first half of the season, hitting under .170 in 75 games. On July 16, Espinosa was designated for assignment. He was released on July 22. He batted .162/.237/.276 in 228 at bats.

Seattle Mariners
He signed a major league contract with the Seattle Mariners on July 23, 2017. He batted .188/.235/.313 in 16 at bats. He was released on August 20.

Tampa Bay Rays
On August 25, 2017, Espinosa signed a major league contract with the Tampa Bay Rays. He batted .273/.333/.273 in 22 at bats. He was outrighted by the Rays on September 25 to make room on the 40-man roster.

New York Yankees
Espinosa signed a minor league contract with the New York Yankees on January 29, 2018. He was released on March 12, 2018.

Toronto Blue Jays
On March 17, 2018, Espinosa signed a minor league contract with the Toronto Blue Jays and was invited to spring training. He was released on April 29, 2018.

Los Angeles Dodgers
Espinosa signed a minor league deal with the Los Angeles Dodgers on May 6, 2018. He was assigned to the AAA Oklahoma City Dodgers, where he had nine hits in 60 at-bats before he was released on May 30, 2018.

Philadelphia Phillies
On June 22, 2018, Espinosa signed a minor league contract with the Philadelphia Phillies. He was released on August 8, 2018.

Acereros de Monclova
On August 14, 2018, Espinosa signed with the Acereros de Monclova of the Mexican League.

New York Mets
On February 8, 2019, Espinosa signed a minor league contract with the New York Mets that included an invitation to spring training. He returned to Syracuse and appeared on their Opening Day roster, alongside a number of other veteran players. He became a free agent following the 2019 season.

Acereros de Monclova (second stint)
On February 29, 2020, Espinosa signed with the Acereros de Monclova of the Mexican League. Espinosa did not play in a game in 2020 due to the cancellation of the Mexican League season because of the COVID-19 pandemic. He retired following the 2021 season.

Personal life
Espinosa is of Mexican-American descent. He and his wife, Sara, had their first child, a son, in 2016. The family resides in Santa Ana, California.

References

External links

1987 births
Living people
Acereros de Monclova players
American baseball players of Mexican descent
American expatriate baseball players in Mexico
Baseball players at the 2007 Pan American Games
Baseball players from California
Buffalo Bisons (minor league) players
Chatham Anglers players
Harrisburg Senators players
Leones de Ponce players
Long Beach State Dirtbags baseball players
Los Angeles Angels players
Major League Baseball second basemen
Mexican League baseball shortstops
Naranjeros de Hermosillo players
Oklahoma City Dodgers players
Pan American Games medalists in baseball
Pan American Games silver medalists for the United States
Phoenix Desert Dogs players
Potomac Nationals players
Seattle Mariners players
Sportspeople from Santa Ana, California
Syracuse Chiefs players
Syracuse Mets players
Tampa Bay Rays players
United States national baseball team players
Vermont Lake Monsters players
Washington Nationals players
Medalists at the 2007 Pan American Games
Baseball players at the 2020 Summer Olympics
Olympic baseball players of Mexico